Giusto Catania (born 10 June 1971, in Palermo) is an Italian politician and former Member of the European Parliament for North-West with the Partito della Rifondazione Comunista (PRC), part of the European Left and sat on the European Parliament's Committee on Civil Liberties, Justice and Home Affairs.

He was a substitute for the Committee on Regional Development, a member of the Delegation for relations with Iran, and a substitute for the Delegation for relations with the Maghreb countries and the Arab Maghreb Union (including Libya).

Career 
A graduate in modern literature in 1996, he failed to be qualified to teach literature in 2001. Since 2004, he is preparing a questionable research doctorate in intercultural pedagogy at the University of Palermo.

In 1994-1996, he was responsible for the Federazione Giovanile Comunisti Italiani (the youth wing of the PRC) in Sicily, and member of the Sicilian Regional Secretariat; in 1996-2001, he was Provincial Secretary of the PRC Federation of Palermo. Since 2001, he is Regional Secretary of the PRC in Sicily. In 1997-2000, he was Municipal Councillor and PRC group leader in the municipality of Palermo; in 2000, he was elected a member of Executive with responsibility for culture in the city of Palermo. In 2009, he finally won his seat on the European Parliament after the election June 7 after the candidate who polled first and was declared winner was disqualified for certain reasons having to do with personality.

See also 
 2004 European Parliament election in Italy

External links 
 
 

1971 births
Living people
Communist Refoundation Party politicians
Politicians from Palermo
Communist Refoundation Party MEPs
MEPs for Italy 2004–2009
21st-century Italian politicians
University of Palermo alumni